A consort crown is a crown worn by the consort of a monarch for their coronation or on state occasions. 

Unlike with reigning monarchs, who may inherit one or more crowns for use, consorts sometimes had special crowns made uniquely for them and which were worn by no other later consort.

All British queens consort in the 20th century, Alexandra of Denmark, Mary of Teck and Elizabeth Bowes-Lyon, wore their own specially made consort crowns, made in 1902, 1911 and 1937 respectively; (each went on to outlive her respective husband but, as a dowager, retained the title, crown and other privileges of a queen until death). Previous English and British queens consort had used the State Crown of Mary of Modena, wife of King James II, until Adelaide of Saxe-Meiningen, the consort of King William IV, who had a special new consort crown created for her. 

In Imperial Russia, there were no unique consort crowns, because the Lesser Imperial Crown was intended to be used for coronation of all empresses consort, and after that, they did not wear crowns.

Famous consort crowns
Denmark
 Crown of the Queen Consort
France
 Crown of Empress Eugénie 
Hungary
 Crown of the Queen
Iran 
 Empress's Crown 
Norway 
Crown of the Queen
Poland 
Queen's Crown
Crown of Queen Maria Josepha
Portugal
Diadem of the Stars
Romania
 Crown of Queen Elisabeta 
 Crown of Queen Maria
Russia 
Lesser Imperial Crown (the crown used by the Tsaritsas by marriage when being crowned)
Crown of Tsaritsa Maria Feodorovna 
Spain
Crown of the Queen Consort (Used by Queen Mercedes, Queen Maria Christina and  Queen Victoria Eugenie)
Sweden
Crown of the Queen Consort
United Kingdom 
 Crown of Queen Adelaide 
 Crown of Queen Alexandra 
 Crown of Queen Mary  
 Crown of Queen Elizabeth
England
Crown of Mary of Modena 

Monarchy
Crowns (headgear)
State ritual and ceremonies